A chādor (Persian), also variously spelled in English as chadah, chad(d)ar, chader, chud(d)ah, chadur, and naturalized as , is an outer garment or open cloak worn by many women in the Persian-influenced countries of Iran, Afghanistan, Pakistan and to a lesser extent Tajikistan, as well as in Shia communities in Iraq, Bahrain, and Qatif in Saudi Arabia in areas in public spaces or outdoors. A chador is a full-body-length semicircle of fabric that is open down the front. The garment is pulled over the head, and is held closed at the front by the wearer; the chador has no hand openings, buttons, or clasps. It may also be held closed by being tucked under the wearer's arms. The word in Classical Persian could be used in reference to almost any cloth, headscarf, or even tents. This definition is mostly retained in eastern dialects of Persian which commonly use chādar in reference to almost any cloth or scarf, including loosely worn scarves that would be inappropriate to call a chador in Iranian Persian.

Before the 1978–1979 Iranian Revolution, black chadors were reserved for funerals and periods of mourning; colourful, patterned fabrics were the norm for everyday wear. Currently, the majority of Iranian women who wear the chador use the black version outside, and reserve light-coloured chadors for indoor use.

Historical background

Ancient and early Islamic times 

Fadwa El Guindi locates the origin of the veil in ancient Mesopotamia, where "wives and daughters of high-ranking men of the nobility had to veil". The veil marked class status, and this dress code was regulated by sumptuary laws.

One of the first representation of a chador is found on Ergili sculptures and the "Satrap sarcophagus" from Persian Anatolia. 
Bruhn/Tilke, in their 1941 A Pictorial History of Costume, do show a drawing, said to be copied from an Achaemenid relief of the 5th century BC, of an individual with their lower face hidden by a long cloth wrapped around the head. Some have mistakenly claimed this to be a woman, but it is actually a Mede soldier. Achaemenid Iranian women in art were almost always uncovered. The earliest written record of chador can be found in Pahlavi scripts from the 6th century, as a female head dress worn by Zoroastrian women.

It is likely that the custom of veiling continued through the Seleucid, Parthian, and Sassanid periods. Veiling was not limited to noble women but was practised also by the Persian kings. Upper-class Greek and Byzantine women were also secluded from the public gaze. European visitors of the 18th and 19th centuries have left pictorial records of women wearing the chador and the long white veil.

Pahlavi dynasty

The 20th century Pahlavi ruler Reza Shah banned the chador and all hijab during the Kashf-e hijab in 1936, as incompatible with his modernizing ambitions. According to Mir-Hosseini, as cited by El Guindi, "the police were arresting women who wore the veil and forcibly removing it". This policy outraged the Shi'a clerics, and ordinary men and women, to whom "appearing in public without their cover was tantamount to nakedness". However, she continues, "this move was welcomed by Westernized and upperclass men and women, who saw it in liberal terms as a first step in granting women their rights".

Iranian Revolution 
After the Iranian Revolution, compulsory hijab were introduced, which was met with opposition from women during the International Women's Day Protests in Tehran, 1979.

In April 1980, during the Iranian Cultural Revolution, it was decided that it would be mandatory for women in government offices and educational institutions to observe the veil. In 1983, a dispute regarding the veiling broke out, and public conflict was motivated by the definition of veiling and its scale (so-called "bad hijab" issue), sometimes followed even by clashes against those who were perceived to wear improper clothing. Government felt obligated to deal with this situation; so, on 26 July 1984, Tehran's public prosecutor issued a statement and announced that stricter dress-code is supposed to be observed in public places such as institutions, theaters, clubs, hotels, motels, and restaurants, while in the other places, it should follow the pattern of the overwhelming majority of people. Stricter veiling implies both chador and more loosely khimar-type headscarf, along with overcoat.

Usage 

Before the 1978–1979 Iranian Revolution, black chadors were worn by many women and girls for different purposes. Light, printed fabrics were the norm for everyday wear. Currently, the majority of women who wear the chador reserve the usage of light-colored chadors for around the house or for prayers. Most women who still go outside in urban areas in a light colored chador are elderly women of rural backgrounds. During the reign of the Shah of Iran, such traditional clothing was largely discarded by the wealthier urban upper-class women in favor of modernity for western clothing, although women in small towns and villages continued to wear the chador. Traditionally a light coloured or printed chador was worn with a headscarf (rousari), a blouse (pirahan), and a long skirt (daaman); or else a blouse and skirt or dress over pants (shalvar), and these styles continue to be worn by many rural Iranian women, in particular by older women.

On the other hand, in Iran, the chador does not require the wearing of a veil. Inside the home, particularly for urban women, both the chador and the veil have been discarded, and there, women and teenagers wore cooler and lighter garments; while in modern times, rural women continue to wear a light-weight printed chador inside the home over their clothing during their daily activities. The chador is worn by some Iranian women, regardless of whether they are Sunni or Shia, but is considered traditional to Persian Iranians, with Iranians of other backgrounds wearing the chador or other traditional forms of attire. For example, Arab Iranian women in Western and Southern Iran retain their overhead Abaya  which is similar to the overhead Abaya worn in Iraq, Kuwait, and Bahrain.

Beyond Iran 
However, an Indian and Pakistani cādar may more closely resemble a dupatta. The Hindustani word can also refer to other type of sheets, such as bed sheets.
There is also a small Haredi Jewish group in which the women wear black head-to-toe cloaks similar to the chador.

See also

 Headscarf
 Women in Iran
 Hijab by country

References

Further reading

 Briant, Pierre (2002), From Cyrus to Alexander, Winona Lake: Eisenbrauns
 Bruhn, Wolfgang, and Tilke, Max (1973), A Pictorial History of Costume, original published as Kostümwerk, 1955, Tübingen: Ernst Wasmuth
 El Guindi, Fadwa (1999), Veil: Modesty, Privacy, and Resistance, Oxford/New York: Berg
 Mir-Hosseini, Ziba (1996), "Stretching The Limits: A Feminist Reading of the Shari'a in Post-Khomeini Iran," in Mai Yamani (ed.), Feminism and Islam: Legal and Literary Perspectives, pp. 285–319. New York: New York University Press

Islamic female clothing
History of Asian clothing
Iranian clothing
Persian words and phrases
Robes and cloaks
Veils